Belarus participated in the Eurovision Song Contest 2011 with the song "I Love Belarus" written by Evgeny Oleynik and Svetlana Geraskova. The song was performed by Anastasia Vinnikova, who was internally selected by the Belarusian broadcaster National State Television and Radio Company of the Republic of Belarus (BTRC) to represent the nation at the 2011 contest in Düsseldorf, Germany. Anastasia Vinnikova and the song "Born in Byelorussia" were initially announced as the Belarusian entry on 28 February 2011, however the song was reworked and retitled as "I Am Belarusian". The song was later disqualified and the replacement entry, "I Love Belarus", was announced on 14 March 2011.

Belarus was drawn to compete in the second semi-final of the Eurovision Song Contest which took place on 12 May 2011. Performing during the show in position 16, "I Love Belarus" was not announced among the top 10 entries of the second semi-final and therefore did not qualify to compete in the final. It was later revealed that Belarus placed fourteenth out of the 19 participating countries in the semi-final with 45 points.

Background 

Prior to the 2011 contest, Belarus had participated in the Eurovision Song Contest seven times since its first entry in 2004. The nation's best placing in the contest was sixth, which it achieved in 2007 with the song "Work Your Magic" performed by Koldun. In 2010, Belarus qualified to the final and placed twenty-fourth with the song "Butterflies" performed by 3+2 featuring Robert Wells.

The Belarusian national broadcaster, National State Television and Radio Company of the Republic of Belarus (BTRC), broadcasts the event within Belarus and organises the selection process for the nation's entry. The broadcaster has used both internal selections and national finals to select the Belarusian entry for Eurovision in the past. In 2010, BTRC has organised an internal selection in order to choose Belarus' entry, a selection procedure that continued for their 2011 entry.

Before Eurovision

Internal selection 
Despite reports by Serbian newspaper Blic that Irina Dorofeeva had been internally selected to represent Belarus at the Eurovision Song Contest 2011 with a song written by 2004 Serbia and Montenegrin Eurovision contestant Željko Joksimović, BTRC opened a submission period where artists and composers were able to submit their applications and entries to the broadcaster between 25 January 2011 and 21 February 2011. At the closing of the deadline, 29 entries were received by the broadcaster, of which 22 were valid. Among the artists that had submitted entries were Aura, E.V.A., Katya Langer, Lena Voloshina, Marat Gringauz and Zhnyuv.

A jury panel consisting of representatives of broadcasters BTRC, LAD, ONT and STV was tasked with evaluating the received entries and "Born in Byelorussia" performed by Anastasia Vinnikova was announced as the Belarusian entry for the 2011 Eurovision Song Contest on 28 February 2011. The song, which was written by Evgeny Oleynik and Svetlana Geraskova, had previously participated in the third season of the ONT music competition Musical Court where it failed to qualify to the final. On 3 March 2011, BTRC announced that the song had undergone lyrical changes and was retitled as "I Am Belarusian".

Disqualification and replacement 
On 12 March 2011, BTRC announced that "I Am Belarusian" had been disqualified as the song had been publicly performed by Anastasia Vinnikova during a concert in May 2010. The replacement song, "I Love Belarus" written by Evgeny Oleynik and Svetlana Geraskova, was presented to the public via the release of the official music video, directed by Alexander Potapov and filmed at the "Belarusfilm" studio in Minsk, on 14 March 2011.

Promotion 
Anastasia Vinnikova specifically promoted "I Love Belarus" as the Belarusian Eurovision entry on 14 April 2011 by performing during the Eurovision in Concert event which was held at the Club Air venue in Amsterdam, Netherlands and hosted by Cornald Maas, Esther Hart and Sascha Korf.

At Eurovision
According to Eurovision rules, all nations with the exceptions of the host country and the "Big Five" (France, Germany, Italy, Spain and the United Kingdom) are required to qualify from one of two semi-finals in order to compete for the final; the top ten countries from each semi-final progress to the final. The European Broadcasting Union (EBU) split up the competing countries into six different pots based on voting patterns from previous contests, with countries with favourable voting histories put into the same pot. On 17 January 2011, a special allocation draw was held which placed each country into one of the two semi-finals. Belarus was placed into the second semi-final, to be held on 12 May 2011. The running order for the semi-finals was decided through another draw on 15 March 2011 and Belarus was set to perform in position 16, following the entry from Estonia and before the entry from Latvia.

The two semi-finals and the final were broadcast in Belarus on Belarus 1 with commentary by Denis Kurian. The Belarusian spokesperson, who announced the Belarusian votes during the final, was Leila Ismailava.

Semi-final 
Anastasia Vinnikova took part in technical rehearsals on 4 and 8 May, followed by dress rehearsals on 11 and 12 May. This included the jury show on 11 May where the professional juries of each country watched and voted on the competing entries.

The Belarusian performance featured Anastasia Vinnikova performing on stage wearing a short dress together with four backing vocalists/dancers and a dulcimer player all wearing black and white outfits. Vinnikova and her backing performers used glitter microphone stands and performed a choreographed routine that involved waving hands. The LED screens displayed red and white elements that reminded of the Belarusian flag. The performance also featured pyrotechnic effects. The backing vocalists/dancers and the dulcimer player that accompanied Vinnikova during the performance were: Artyom Ahpash, Anastasiya Shik, Alyona Gorbachova, Yuri Naurotski and Ludmila Kutz. Yuri Naurotski would go on to represent Belarus in the Eurovision Song Contest 2015 under the artistic name Uzari, performing together with Maimuna.

At the end of the show, Belarus was not announced among the top 10 entries in the second semi-final and therefore failed to qualify to compete in the final. It was later revealed that Belarus placed fourteenth in the semi-final, receiving a total of 45 points.

Voting 
Voting during the three shows involved each country awarding points from 1-8, 10 and 12 as determined by a combination of 50% national jury and 50% televoting. Each nation's jury consisted of five music industry professionals who are citizens of the country they represent. This jury judged each entry based on: vocal capacity; the stage performance; the song's composition and originality; and the overall impression by the act. In addition, no member of a national jury was permitted to be related in any way to any of the competing acts in such a way that they cannot vote impartially and independently.

Below is a breakdown of points awarded to Belarus and awarded by Belarus in the second semi-final and grand final of the contest. The nation awarded its 12 points to Ukraine in the semi-final and to Georgia in the final of the contest.

Points awarded to Belarus

Points awarded by Belarus

References

External links
 BTRC's official Eurovision site

2011
Countries in the Eurovision Song Contest 2011
Eurovision